Ranjit Naik-Nimbalkar, is an Indian politician and member of the 17th Lok Sabha, representing Madha constituency, Maharashtra. He is a member of the Bharatiya Janata Party.

References 

India MPs 2019–present
Lok Sabha members from Maharashtra
Living people
Bharatiya Janata Party politicians from Maharashtra
1977 births